Florida's at-large congressional district may refer to a few different occasions when a statewide at-large district was used for elections to the United States House of Representatives from Florida. The district is obsolete.

Prior to Florida's admittance as a state of the Union in 1845, congressional delegates for Florida Territory were elected from Florida Territory's at-large congressional district.  The first elected U.S. representative from the state was installed October 6, 1845.

A single representative was elected from the state from after statehood to 1873, when a second representative was elected for 1 term beginning in 1873.  District representation began in 1875.

Subsequently, on occasion an at-large representative would be elected in addition to representatives being elected from districts.  This would occur 1913-1915, 1933–1937, and 1943-1945.

The district became obsolete January 3, 1945.

List of members representing the district 
After the 1870 census, a second seat was apportioned to Florida. Briefly, for the  Congress, a second at-large seat was used. After that, there were two geographic districts created.

References

 Congressional Biographical Directory of the United States 1774–present

At-large
Former congressional districts of the United States
At-large United States congressional districts